Acara orthobunyavirus (ACAV) is a species in the genus Orthobunyavirus, belonging to the Capim serogroup. It is isolated from sentinel mice, Culex species, and the rodent Nectomys squamipes in Pará, Brazil and in Panama. The symptoms of the Acará virus is death. Sometimes reported to cause disease in humans.

References 

Orthobunyaviruses